Pudhu Padagan is a 1990 Indian Tamil-language masala film written, produced and directed by Kalaipuli S. Thanu who also composed the music. The film stars Vijayakanth and Amala. It was released on 14 April 1990.

Plot 

Manikkam and Devi are cousins and they are in love since their childhood. Durai has a sister Valli and she marries Raja. Devi has a brother, a sister-in-law Gowri and a niece Baby.

Manikkam's former boss smuggles idols from the temples and sells them illegally; he also desires to wed Devi. One day, Manikkam finds the culprit and sends him to jail. Valli and her husband have trouble with Arumugam. Manikkam goes to Raja's village to solve their troubles.

Baby vanishes several times and the doctor says that Baby has a serious disease. To save Baby, they must have a lot of money but the doctor's son asks Devi to marry him and they will operate Baby for free.

When Manikkam is back to his village, he sees Devi married. Devi goes to the doctor's house and the doctor's mother is found dead. Manikkam tells what happened in Raja's village. Raja killed Arumugam, who beat his wife Valli, and Manikkam to save his brother-in-law went to jail for six months.

Lonely without his lover, Manikkam becomes mad. Devi's husband has a car accident and dies before their wedding night. Devi's father-in-law advises her to go to her village to forget this misadventure. Devi's father-in-law treats Manikkam but he fails. With Devi's help, Manikkam becomes again as before and the doctor tells Devi's choice.

Manikkam's former boss tries to rape Devi, but Manikkam kills him and Devi also dies because of her injuries.

Cast 
Vijayakanth as Manikkam
Amala as Devi
Sarathkumar as Manikkam's former boss
Radha Ravi as the doctor
Chandrasekhar as Devi's brother
Rajyalakshmi as Gowri
Baby Aparna as Baby
Chinni Jayanth
Charle
Anandaraj
Meesai Murugesan as Kunjithapatham
Usilaimani
LIC Narasimhan
Thalapathy Dinesh
Sivaji Manohar as the doctor's son (guest appearance)
Anandaraj as Arumugam (guest appearance)

Production 
The film was initially titled Theru Paadagan then retitled Pudhu Padagan. It is Thanu's only film as director, and was shot in Ooty.

Soundtrack 
The music was composed by Thanu, who also wrote the lyrics.

Reception 
P. S. S. of Kalki wrote that despite the title, there was no newness, no singer, and after seeing the title, as one watches the film they would feel disappointed.

References

External links 
 

1990 directorial debut films
1990 films
1990s masala films
1990s Tamil-language films
Films shot in Ooty